New Line Learning Academy is a coeducational secondary school with academy status under The Future Schools Trust banner, which includes the nearby Cornwallis Academy, Tiger Primary School, and Tiger Cubs Day Nursery.  It is located in Loose (near Maidstone) in the English county of Kent. It was formed as a result of a merger between Oldborough Manor Community School and Senacre Technology College. The school converted to academy status in September 2007 and was renamed "New Line Learning Academy." The school is now sponsored by "Future Schools Trust", but was previously a foundation school administered by Kent County Council (KCC). However, New Line Learning Academy continues to coordinate with KCC for their student admission process.

New Line Learning Academy offers GCSEs, BTECs, and NCFEs as programmes of study for students. All sixth form courses previously located on the site have been moved to the neighbouring Cornwallis Academy.
A “Performing Arts School of Excellence” program has been developed primarily aimed at promoting skills in Drama, Dance, Music, and Technical Theatre. This program offers opportunities to students to perform in theatre productions, create performances, and gain an RSL grade in Musical Theatre.

Facilities
New Line Learning Academy relocated to a new building in 2010, and facilities include one of the largest indoor sports halls in Kent. The sports hall and school playing fields are used as the home ground of the Maidstone Pumas, an American Football team currently playing in the National Division South Central Conference of the BAFA National Leagues (BAFANL).

A school farm that is accessible to students and members of the local community who express interest has been on the Academy site for more than 70 years. Animals on the farm include cattle, sheep, goats, rabbits, a flock of poultry, and a donkey.

References

External links
Official School Website

Secondary schools in Kent
Academies in Kent